The Brazil national football team represents the country of Brazil in international association football. It is fielded by the Brazilian Football Confederation (CBF), the governing body of football in Brazil, and competes as a member of CONMEBOL, which encompasses the countries of South America. As hundreds of players have played for the team since it started officially registering its players, only players with 20 or more official caps are included.

Eight players – Cafu, Thiago Silva, Roberto Carlos, Dani Alves, Lúcio, Cláudio Taffarel, Neymar and Robinho – have won 100 or more caps for Brazil.

List of players

Key

As of 24 November 2022

References

 
Lists of Brazil international footballers
Association football player non-biographical articles